Raymond Ramandimbilahatra is a Malagasy politician. He is a member of the Senate of Madagascar for Analamanga, and is a member of the Tiako I Madagasikara party.

External links
Official page on the Senate website 

Year of birth missing (living people)
Living people
Members of the Senate (Madagascar)
Tiako I Madagasikara politicians
Place of birth missing (living people)